Sarkash Sindhi (Sindhi سرڪش سنڌي) 1 October 1940 - 5 March 2012) his Real name is Abdul majeed Chandio he was primary school teacher & poet. He is father of Raziya nayab (nayab Sarkash sindh) & (Son of famous Religious scholar Moulana Abdullah chandio) was a prominent poet of Sindhi language.

Early life
Sarkash Sindhi was born on 1 October 1940 at village Palipota, Mehar Taluka , Dadu District. He got his early education at his birthplace. Later his parents shifted to village Jawabpur Chandio close to Dhakhan town of Shikarpur District, Sindh, Pakistan. Afterward, he settled in Ratodero and then he moved to Larkana. He was primary teacher. and retired from services as high school teacher.

Works
He wrote nine books of poetry. His main books are Derd-e-dil, Amun Aab-e-Hayat, Piyar aen Azadi, Sindhu Gai thi, Samund Chholiyoon, Tahak and Zindagi ji Goonj.

Death
He died on 5 March 2012 due to cancer and left a widow, two daughters and a son.

References

Pakistani poets
Sindhi people
Sindhi poetry
Sindhi-language poets
1940 births
2012 deaths